A Bachelor of Fine Arts (BFA) is a standard undergraduate degree for students for pursuing a professional education in the visual, fine or performing arts. It is also called Bachelor of Visual Arts (BVA) in some cases.

Background
The Bachelor of Fine Arts degree differs from a Bachelor of Arts (BA) degree in that the majority of the program consists of a practical studio component, as contrasted with lecture and discussion classes. 

A Bachelor of Fine Arts degree will often require an area of specialty such as acting, architecture, musical theatre, game design, animation, ceramics, computer animation, creative writing, dance, dramatic writing, drawing, fashion design, fiber, film production, graphic design, illustration, industrial design, interior design, metalworking, music, new media, painting, photography, printmaking, sculpture, stage management, technical arts, television production, visual arts, or visual effects. Some schools instead give their students a broad education in many disciplines of the arts.

Although a Bachelor of Fine Arts is traditionally considered a four-year degree, a BFA program may take shorter or longer to complete because of the amount of studio course work required. After completing this degree, the learner may acquire postgraduate degree; Master of Fine Arts.

BFA in countries

United States
A typical BFA program in the United States consists of two-thirds study in the arts, with one-third in more general liberal arts studies. For a BA in Art, the ratio might be reversed. The National Association of Schools of Art and Design (NASAD), which accredits Bachelor's of Fine Arts programs in visual art and design in the United States, states that "the professional degree (BFA) focuses on intensive work in the visual arts supported by a program of general studies," whereas "the liberal arts degree (BA) focuses on art and design in the context of a broad program of general studies."

United Kingdom
In the United Kingdom, BA Fine Arts is equivalent to BFA. Specific degrees such as the Bachelor of Dance or Bachelor of Drama are used by some performing arts institutions in Australia, the US, and much of Europe.

India
In India, a Fine Arts undergraduate degree may also be known as BVA (Bachelor of Visual Arts). It is usually a four year program in which the first year is preparatory session. By the second year, learners have a specialization such as Painting, Photography and more. However, some institutions have 3 year curriculum in which students are already opted for their specialization. Specializations such as Acting, Dancing, Singing, etc. would come under Bachelor of Performing Arts (BPA).

In some countries such a degree (BFA) is called a Bachelor of Creative Arts (BCA).

See also 

 Master of Fine Arts
 Undergraduate Degree
 Photography
 Visual Arts
 Performing Arts

References

External links
NASAD official website
 

Fine Arts, Bachelor
Performing arts education
Visual arts education